John "Wynn" ap Maredudd (died 9 July 1559) was a Welsh Member of Parliament.

He was son of Meredydd ap Ieuan ap Robert of Dolwyddelan, then Caernarvonshire. He had twenty six siblings. He is cited by Sir John Wynn, 1st Baronet as his ancestor and head of the family at that time. He is believed to have had a number of children including Morys Wynn ap John, Owain Wynn ap John, Griffith Wynn ap John and Robert Wynn (MP). His brother -in-law was Edward Stanley, MP for Merioneth.

He inherited his father's estates at Gwydir, Nantconwy, Dolwyddelan and Llanfrothen. He rebuilt Gwydir in 1555 and served as Member of Parliament for Caernarvonshire in 1542 (probably) and 1547–1551. He also served as High Sheriff of Caernarvonshire for 1544 and 1556. and as Custos Rotulorum of Merionethshire from 1543 to c.1548.

He was succeeded by his son Morys Wynn ap John (Maurice Wynn).

References

 The History of Parliament

Welsh royalty
House of Cunedda
Members of the Parliament of England (pre-1707) for constituencies in Wales
High Sheriffs of Caernarvonshire
Year of birth missing
1559 deaths